Williamson Historic District is a historic district in Williamson, West Virginia that roughly is bounded by the Norfolk and Western Railroad tracks, Pritchard, Poplar, Park, Mulberry and Elm Streets.

References

National Register of Historic Places in Mingo County, West Virginia
Historic districts in Mingo County, West Virginia
Queen Anne architecture in West Virginia
Historic districts on the National Register of Historic Places in West Virginia